Chief Haka (Hawaiian: Aliʻi Haka; Hawaiian pronunciation: Hah-kah; born ca. 14th century) was a High Chief of the Hawaiian island of Oahu, in ancient Hawaii. He is mentioned in old legends and chants.

Biography 
Haka was born on Oʻahu, most likely in the 14th century.

His father was High Chief Kapae-a-Lakona of Oʻahu, son of the Chief Lakona of Oahu. Thus, he was from the House of Maweke. Hakaʻs mother was Wehina; she was Kapae-a-Lakonaʻs consort.

Haka married Kapunawahine (wahine = "woman/wife"). She became a chiefess by this marriage. She bore Haka a son, Kapiko-a-Haka. Wife of Kapiko was named Ulakiokalani. The couple produced three daughters:
Ka’auiokalani
Kaʻulala
Kamili

Haka became a monarch after his fatherʻs death, and was succeeded himself by Maʻilikākahi.

References 

Royalty of Oahu
14th-century births
Year of death unknown